Drammen Bandy is a bandy club from Drammen, Norway, formed on 16 June 1997 as a cooperation between several teams in the city.

History
The clubs which handed over their bandy activities to Drammen Bandy when it was founded, were 
 SK Drafn, 
 Drammens Ballklubb,
 SBK Skiold,
 Strømsgodset IF,
 Sparta/Bragerøen,
 Konnerud IL

Current activities
Drammen Bandy play in the Norwegian Bandy Premier League. Their current head coach is Ove Ronny Nørgaard.

In a joint venture with Nordre Sande IL, Drammen Bandy has won the Norwegian Championship for women in 2012, 2013, 2014, and 2015.

External links

ibdb.bandysidan

Bandy clubs in Norway
Sport in Drammen
Bandy clubs established in 1997
1997 establishments in Norway